Éver Gonzalo Alvarado Sandoval (born 30 January 1992) is a Honduran professional footballer who plays as a left-back for Olimpia, whom he captains, and the Honduras national team.

Club career
Alvarado began his professional career at Real C.D. España in 2011. He made his debut on 13 August 2011, in a 2–2 draw against C.D. Necaxa.

On 25 July 2014, he joined C.D. Olimpia and made his debut the following 29 August against Alpha United FC in the CONCACAF Champions League.

On 24 June 2016, Alvarado signed with Major League Soccer side Sporting Kansas City. He made his debut the following 16 August in a 2–2 draw with Central F.C. in the CONCACAF Champions League.

on 24 January 2017, Olimpia confirmed the return of Alvarado, along with Alexander López, to the club.

International goals
Scores and results list Honduras' goal tally first.

Honors

Club
Olimpia
CONCACAF League: 2017

References

External links
 Sporting KC player profile
 

1992 births
Living people
Honduran footballers
Honduran expatriate footballers
Honduras international footballers
C.D. Olimpia players
Real C.D. España players
Sporting Kansas City players
Sporting Kansas City II players
Major League Soccer players
USL Championship players
People from Yoro Department
Expatriate soccer players in the United States
Honduran expatriate sportspeople in the United States
Association football defenders
2017 Copa Centroamericana players
2017 CONCACAF Gold Cup players
Copa Centroamericana-winning players
2019 CONCACAF Gold Cup players
Honduras under-20 international footballers
Honduras youth international footballers